The 1950 Utah State Aggies football team was an American football team that represented Utah State University in the Skyline Conference during the 1950 college football season. In their second and final season under head coach George Melinkovich, the Aggies compiled a 2–9 record (0–5 against Skyline opponents), finished last in the Skyline Conference, and were outscored by opponents by a total of 374 to 107. On defense, the team allowed an average of 34 points per game, ranking 117th out of 120 major college teams.

Schedule

References

Utah State
Utah State Aggies football seasons
Utah State Aggies football